David Blake may refer to:

 David Blake (composer) (born 1936), British composer
 David Blake (English cricketer) (1925–2015), former English cricketer
 David Blake (New Zealand cricketer) (born 1971), New Zealand cricketer
 David Blake (general) (1887–1965), Australian Major General
 Dave Blake (1925–2008), politician from Manitoba Canada
 David Blake (born 1971), known as StankDawg, founder of the hacking group Digital DawgPound
 David Stones (born David Blake, 1988), stage name of U.S. rapper
 DJ Quik (born David Blake, 1970), stage name of U.S. rapper/record producer
 David Blake / Wōden, a character in The Wicked + The Divine